The JPM 01 Médoc is a French amateur-built aircraft that was designed by Jean-Pierre Marie in 1987 and produced by Avions Jean-Pierre Marie (JPM) of Le Mesnil-Esnard. The aircraft is supplied as plans for amateur construction.

The aircraft is named for the French community of Médoc.

Design and development
The Médoc features a cantilever low wing, a two-seats-in-side-by-side configuration enclosed cockpit under a bubble canopy, fixed tricycle landing gear and a single engine in tractor configuration.

The aircraft is made from wood with its flying surfaces covered in doped aircraft fabric. Standard engines recommended are -class Volkswagen air-cooled engines, including the  Limbach L2000 four-stroke powerplant.

Almost thirty years after its introduction the aircraft was redesigned and lightened, gaining slotted flaps to reduce stall speed.

Specifications (JPM 01 Médoc)

References

External links

Official photos of the JPM 01 Médoc

Homebuilt aircraft
Single-engined tractor aircraft
Avions Jean-Pierre Marie aircraft